The 2022–23 CEV Challenge Cup is the 43rd edition of the third most important European volleyball club competition organised by the European Volleyball Confederation.

Participating teams
The Drawing of Lots was held on 28 June 2022 in Luxembourg City.

Format
Qualification round (Home and away matches):
32nd Finals

Main phase (Home and away matches):
16th Finals → 8th Finals → 4th Finals

Final phase (Home and away matches):
Semifinals → Finals

Aggregate score is counted as follows: 3 points for 3–0 or 3–1 win, 2 points for 3–2 win, 1 point for 2–3 loss.
In case the teams are tied after two legs, a Golden Set is played immediately at the completion of the second leg.

Qualification round

32nd Finals

|}

First leg
|}

Second leg
|}

Main phase

16th Finals

|}

First leg
|}

Second leg
|}

8th Finals

|}

First leg
|}

Second leg
|}

4th Finals

|}

First leg
|}

Second leg
|}

Final phase

Semifinals

|}

First leg
|}

Second leg
|}

Finals

|}

First leg
|}

Second leg
|}

Final standings

Awards

Most Valuable Player
  Dragan Travica (Olympiacos Piraeus)
Best Scorer
  Alexander Safonov (Maccabi Tel Aviv)
Best Spiker
  Jasper Wijkstra (Doetinchem)
Best Server
  Alexander Safonov (Maccabi Tel Aviv)
Best Blocker
  Viacheslav Batchkala (Maccabi Tel Aviv)
Best Setter
  Aggelos Georgiou (Panathinaikos Athens)
Best Receiver
  Vladislav Kunchenko (Murov)

References

External links
 Official website

CEV Challenge Cup
CEV Challenge Cup
CEV Challenge Cup